Peter Nelson (born September 10, 1959) (sometimes credited as Calvin Persson) is an American actor, producer, and writer. He is perhaps best known for his role as the evil visitor youth leader Brian in the 1983 NBC miniseries V and the 1984 sequel, V: The Final Battle.

His film credits range include Purple Haze (1983), The Last Starfighter (1984), The Expendables (1989), Crime Zone (1989), Sounds of Silence (1989), Silk 2 (1989), Curfew (1989), Last Stand at Lang Mei (1989), and Die Hard 2 (1990), Final Vendetta (1996) and Double Team (1997). In 2001 he appeared in the film Delivering Milo. His most recent film appearance was in the Syfy movie Sharktopus as Commander Cox (credited under his alternate name Calvin Persson). Nelson has made guest appearances on TV shows such as The Facts of Life, Miami Vice and Kindred: The Embraced.

Filmography

Actor

Film

Television

Producer

References

External links

Living people
1959 births
Male actors from Los Angeles
American male film actors
American male television actors